Phil Brown (March 14, 1901 – May 16, 1991) was an American football, basketball, and track coach.
He served as the head football coach at Washington College in Chestertown, Maryland from 1927 to 1927, Rose Polytechnic Institute—now known as Rose-Hulman Institute of Technology from 1928 to 1942 and again from 1946 to 1958, and Indiana State Teachers College—now known as Indiana State University in 1944. Brown also coached basketball and track at Rose Poly before retiring in 1959.

Brown graduated from Arsenal Technical High School in Indianapolis, Indiana in 1918 and then played college football at Butler University. He died on May 16, 1991.

Head coaching record

College football

References

1901 births
1991 deaths
Butler Bulldogs football players
Indiana State Sycamores football coaches
Rose–Hulman Fightin' Engineers athletic directors
Rose–Hulman Fightin' Engineers football coaches
Rose–Hulman Fightin' Engineers men's basketball coaches
Washington College Shoremen football coaches
College track and field coaches in the United States
High school football coaches in Illinois
Coaches of American football from Indiana
Players of American football from Indianapolis
Basketball coaches from Indiana